Kuleshov and Kuleshova (feminine) is a common Russian surname that traces its origins to  Ukraine

People with this surname include:
 Aleksey Kuleshov (b. 1979), a Russian  volleyball player
 Alla Kuleshova (b. 1945), Russian rower
 Arkadi Kuleshov (b. 1914), a Belorussian poet and translator
 Lev Kuleshov (1899–1970), a Soviet filmmaker and film theorist, who demonstrated the Kuleshov effect
 Mikhail Kuleshov (b. 1981), a Russian ice hockey player
 Oleg Kuleshov (b. 1974), a Russian handball player
 Vladimir Kuleshov (b. 1986), a Russian footballer

References
 

Russian-language surnames